The Taoyuan Football Association, founded on October 27, 2002, is a Taiwanese non-governmental organization. Its purpose is to promote children's football in Taoyuan City.

See also
 Chinese Taipei Football Association

External links 
 Taoyuan Football Association Official Site

Regional football associations in Taiwan
2002 establishments in Taiwan